The Nikon D800 is a 36.3-megapixel professional-grade full-frame digital single-lens reflex camera produced by Nikon Corporation. It was given a Gold Award by Digital Photography Review.

It was officially announced on February 7, 2012 and went on sale in late March 2012 for the suggested retail price of $2999.95 in the U.S., £2399 in the UK, and €2892 in the Eurozone. Shortly after the camera went on sale, Nikon's UK subsidiary increased the price of the D800 in that market by £200 to £2599, saying that the original price was due to an "internal systems error". However, Nikon honored the original price for all pre-orders placed before March 24, and added that no price changes would be made in other markets.

The successor is the Nikon D810 – announced June 26, 2014.

Features
36.8 (36.3 effective) megapixel full-frame (35.9 mm × 24 mm) sensor with ISO 100–6400 (ISO 50–25600 boost)
Nikon Expeed 3 image processor
91,000 pixel RGB metering sensor with Advanced Scene Recognition System
Advanced Multi-CAM3500FX autofocus sensor (51-point, 15 cross-type, 11 points sensitive at maximum apertures as small as 8)
H.264/MPEG-4 AVC Expeed video processor. 1080p Full HD movie mode at 24/25/30 fps, 720p at 24/25/30/50/60 fps, HDMI HD video out with support of uncompressed video output, stereo monitor headphone out, and stereo input (3.5-mm diameter) with manual sound level control.
4 frames per second in continuous FX mode or 5:4 crop mode. 5 frames per second in continuous 1.2× crop mode or DX (APS-C) mode. With the optional MB-D12 battery grip, fitted with either the EN-EL18 battery pack of the D4 or AA batteries, continuous shooting at 6 frames per second in DX mode is supported.
Buffer size for 17 RAW or 56 JPEG with maximum quality.
Built-in High dynamic range imaging (HDR) mode (2 frames up to 3EV apart)
'Active D-Lighting' with 6 settings and bracketing (adjusts metering and D-Lighting curve)
Customizable 'Picture Control' settings affecting exposure, white balance, sharpness, brightness, saturation, hue; allowing custom curves to be created, edited, saved, exported and imported
Pop-up flash that doubles as a wireless flash controller
USB 3.0 connectivity
Image sensor cleaning
Shutter rated at 200,000 actuations
Live View with either phase detect or improved contrast detect Auto Focus
Dual card slots, one CompactFlash UDMA and one SD, SDHC, SDXC, UHS-I and Eye-Fi (WLAN) compatible card slot (mirror, overflow, back-up, RAW on 1/JPEG on 2, Stills on 1/Movies on 2, copy) 
Magnesium alloy weather-sealed body comparable to D700, but considered less robust than D4
 GPS interface for direct geotagging supported by Nikon GP-1

Image quality
At the time of its release, the Nikon D800 became the Dxomark image sensor leader, replacing the Nikon D4 in the top position.

D800E
The D800E is a specialized version which uses a new optical anti-aliasing filter with no low-pass filter effect (no blurring) to obtain the sharpest images possible. Nikon claims that possible aliasing effects (moiré) can be lessened by software-processing in camera or external programs like Nikon's Capture NX2.

Reviewers have pointed out that although increased moiré is difficult to remove in post-processing, it is relatively easy to combat while photo-taking (such as by changing the angle, aperture or position). Furthermore, moire is rarely found in photos (besides man-made, repeated patterns such as in architecture). The lack of low-pass filter brings about a small improvement in optical resolution in the 800E, especially in portraits with larger apertures, where diffraction is not an issue.  Even minimal diffraction, negates the advantage of the 800E

Mislabelled D800 as D800E fraud 
Nikon has advised that there are mislabelled Nikon D800E in circulation that are actually the D800 model with the front cover replaced so as to appear like a D800E. A D800 modified to appear to be a D800E is not covered under Nikon warranty. Nikon advises users to "please take all necessary precautions to ensure the authenticity of a camera before purchasing one".

To detect fake models the user has to display an image captured with the camera in the camera's monitor. The name of the camera used to capture the image will be displayed at the top right corner of the display when the overview display option is enabled in full-frame playback mode. If the correct model number is displayed, it is authentic.

References

External links
 Nikon D800 — Nikon global website
 Nikon D800/D800E Manual
 Google Image: Nikon D800 and D800E sample, review and user images, >20MPix
 Nikon D800 Press Release
 Nikon D800 Review at Camera Labs

D800
D800
Live-preview digital cameras
Cameras introduced in 2012
Full-frame DSLR cameras